{{Infobox film
| name     = Atayalangal
| image    = Atayalangal.jpg
| caption  = A still from the movie
| writer   = M. G. Sasi
| based_on = {{based on|Anubhavangal|Nandanar}}
| starring = Govind Padmasoorya JyothirmayiT. G. RaviAnirudh RaviSathiV. K. Sreeraman
| director = M. G. Sasi
| producer = Aravind Venugopal
| studio   = Valluvanadan Talkies
| released = 
| country  = India
| language = Malayalam
| music    = Vidyadharan
}}Atayalangal is a 2008 Malayalam-language biographical drama film directed by M.G. Sasi and produced by Aravind Venugopal under the banner Valluvanadan Talkies. Govind Padmasoorya plays the lead role of autobiographical character of Nandanar (1926–1974), well known for his child literature and philosophical army stories. The film is particularly based on Nandanar's autobiography Anubhavangal.

History
Set in the backdrop of a Valluvanadan hamlet in Kerala, the film depicts the three different types of hunger of human life: that of body, spirit, and mind. Jyothirmayi plays the female lead role of Meenakshikutty whose love transforms the hero into a soldier fighting for his cause. The film opened in Kerala theatres on 5 September, after several post-production difficulties.

The film received Kerala State Film Awards for the Best Film, Best Director, Best Cinematography, Best Processing Lab and Special Jury award for Supporting Actor, the role done by yesteryear's villain T. G. Ravi. It received the NETPAC Award for Best Malayalam Film at the 13th International Film Festival of Kerala. The film also got Aravindan National Awards - Special Jury Mention for Best Film of a Debutante Director.

Director M. G. Sasi has commented, "Atayalangal'' takes you through the kaleidoscopic world which Nandanar created through his works comprising children's literature, re-creations of rural life and stories which smell of blood and gunpowder. Hunger is the leitmotif of the film, especially hunger of the body and mind. The movie presents in a framework all these hungers, heightened or lessened, which form the substance of all human life in all ages."

Cast
 Master Anirudh Ravi / Govind Padmasoorya / Govind Menon -Padathuparambil Gopinathan (Gopi)
 Jyothirmayi - Meenakshikutty
 T. G. Ravi - Raman Namboothiri
 V. K. Sreeraman - Damu ettan
 Sathi Premji - Amma (Madhavi)
 T. V. Chandran - Bhaskara Kuruppu
 Madampu Kunjukuttan -Adhikari namboothiri
 Manikandan Pattambi - Ravunni
 C.K.Babu- Velichappadu
 Sobha Teacher - Valyamma
 M.G.Shailaja - Cheriyamma
 Geetha Joseph - Kunjeduthi
 Leela Namboothirippadu - Muttashi
 Pariyanampatta Divakaran - Achan
 Harigovindan - Cheriya Pothuwal
 Madhu - Valya Pothuwal
 Master Ullas -  Ramankutty
 Baby Medha - Malootty

Awards
 Kerala State Film Award, 2008
 Kerala State Film Award for Best Film
 Kerala State Film Award for Best Cinematography - M. J. Radhakrishnan
 Kerala State Film Award for Best Director - M.G. Sasi
 Kerala State Film Award for Best Processing Lab - Prasad Colour Lab
 Kerala State Film Award (Special Jury Award)- T. G. Ravi
 International Film Festival of Kerala
 IFFK 2008 - NETPAC award for the best Malayalam film
 Aravindan National Awards 
 Special Jury Mention for Best Film of a Debutante Director
 Amrita Film awards, 2008
 Best cameraman - M. J. Radhakrishnan

References 

2000s Malayalam-language films
2008 directorial debut films
2008 films
Films about writers
Films based on autobiographies
Indian biographical films
2000s biographical films